Heyatabad may refer to:
 Heyatabad, Hormozgan
 Heyatabad, Divandarreh, Kurdistan Province
 Heyatabad, Kamyaran, Kurdistan Province